Alice in Wonderland is an Australian 51-minute direct-to-video animated film from Burbank Films Australia originally released in 1988.

The film is based on Lewis Carroll's classic English novel, Alice's Adventures in Wonderland, first published in 1865, and was adapted by Paul Leadon. Unlike many other adaptations of the novel, this one did not borrow elements from its sequel, Through the Looking-Glass (1871), combined into one film. Burbank Films Australia produced a 73-minute adaptation of the second novel the year before, in 1987, entitled Alice: Through the Looking-Glass.

This film was produced by Roz Phillips and directed by Rich Trueblood. Quite uncommon among Burbank Films Australia's adaptations of classic literary works, Alice in Wonderland featured one original theme song, composed by Mark Isaacs and sung by Kerrie Biddell.

The copyright in this film is now owned by Pulse Distribution and Entertainment and administered by digital rights management firm NuTech Digital.

Plot summary
Alice is sitting by the riverbank all alone reading her book entitled The Principles of Logical Calculus when she decides she simply could not stand to read any further. She's bored and she hates being stuck in that "horrible place", as she refers to her beautiful outdoor garden. Suddenly out of nowhere, a talking white rabbit wearing a waistcoat and a pocket watch appears, and Alice sees that he is in a big hurry. Running with curiosity, Alice follows the white rabbit down his rabbit hole, and the girl soon finds herself falling deep into the hole. Amazingly, her dress balloons out and she begins to float down past shelves and cupboards, mirrors and other curious objects, which are lined up on shelves.

Alice continues to float until she lands and is then in a place called Wonderland. Inside a hall with many different passages, Alice opens a tiny door leading to what she believes is the most beautiful garden she could have ever imagined. In the distance, Alice spots a very curious sort of race, a caucus race, and watches the animals cheer as a small snail defeats the other animals.

During her day in Wonderland, Alice questions all of the interesting characters she meets, including the Duchess and her Cheshire Cat about the beautiful garden and how to get there. The girl attends a very extraordinary tea party with two very unusual characters, the Mad Hatter and the March Hare, and is finally invited for a game of croquet with her majesty, the Queen of Hearts. When the Knave of Hearts is unjustly accused of stealing some of the queen's tarts, Alice confesses the truth and tells the jury that it was really she who took the tarts when they had been offered to her. Thus ends Alice's day in Wonderland, and upon finding herself once more in her own garden, Alice for a moment believes to have at last found the beautiful garden she had sought; only then does she realize that she's really at home. After a long day of nonsense and topsy-turvy madness, Alice embraces her book on "logical" calculus and smiles back at the wonderful world she had the pleasure of visiting, if only in a dream.

Cast

 Olivia Martin – Alice
 Philip Hinton – Mad Hatter/King Phillip of Hearts/Bill the Lizard/Card Painter
 Paul Johnstone – Cheshire Cat/Chef/The Dormouse/Mock Turtle/Mr. Mouse/Duck/Card Painter
 Moya O'Sullivan – Duchess/Queen of Hearts
 Keith Scott – March Hare/White Rabbit/Dodo/Card Painter

References

External links
 
 
 Alice in Wonderland at the Big Cartoon DataBase

1988 animated films
1980s English-language films
1988 fantasy films
Australian children's animated films
Animated films based on Alice in Wonderland
Direct-to-video animated films
Direct-to-video fantasy films
1988 direct-to-video films
1980s Australian animated films